James Barron (19 July 1913 – 15 September 1969) was an English professional footballer who played as a goalkeeper.

Barron played for Durham City and Blyth Spartans before joining Blackburn Rovers, for whom he made his debut in April 1936. During the Second World War, he played in the North-Eastern League in County Durham, where he was engaged on munitions work. He returned to Blackburn as a guest player for the 1940 Football League War Cup Final, which the Rovers lost to West Ham United. Barron saved a shot from George Foreman before Sam Small scored on the rebound. He resumed his career after the war with Darlington.

His son, Jim Barron, played as a goalkeeper for a number of Football League clubs, making over 400 appearances.

References

1913 births
1969 deaths
People from County Durham (district)
Footballers from County Durham
English footballers
Association football goalkeepers
Durham City A.F.C. players
Blyth Spartans A.F.C. players
Blackburn Rovers F.C. players
Darlington F.C. players
English Football League players
Blackburn Rovers F.C. wartime guest players